To, TO, or T.O. may refer to:

Arts and entertainment

Film and television
 To (film), a 1964 Danish film
 To (anime), a 2009 anime

Other media
 To (play), a Polish-language play by Czesław Miłosz
 Theatre of the Oppressed, originated by Augusto Boal
 "T.O.", a song by Lil Wayne from the album Funeral

People
 To (surname), including To, Tô, and Tō, a group of surnames of east-Asian origin
Tó, Portuguese nickname
Tô, Vietnamese surname
 Terrell Owens, a retired American football wide receiver alternately known as "T.O."

Places
 Thousand Oaks, California
 Tô Department, in Sissili Province of Burkina Faso, and the capital, Tô
 Tonga (ISO 3166-1 alpha-2 country code TO)
 Toronto, Ontario, Canada
 Province of Turin, Italy (sometimes abbreviated as TO—for example, on vehicle registration plates)

Military use
 Officer in tactical command, or tactical officer
 Territorial Defense Forces (TO), a part of the armed forces of the former SFR Yugoslavia
 Tet Offensive, a campaign waged during the Vietnam War

Science and technology

Electronics and computing
 .to, Tonga's Internet country code top-level domain
 Teraoctet (To), a unit of digital information equal to 1012 octets

Other uses in science and technology
 Takeoff, the phase of flight in which an aerospace vehicle or an animal goes from the ground to flying in the air
 Thermal oxidizer, a processing unit for air pollution control in many chemical plants

Transportation
 President Airlines (IATA code TO), a former airline based in Phnom Penh, Cambodia
 transavia.com France (IATA code TO), a low-cost airline operating as an independent part of the Air France-KLM group

Other uses
 To language
 To (kana), a Japanese syllabic character
 Tō, a Japanese pagoda
 Talk.Origins, a moderated Usenet discussion forum concerning the origins of life, and evolution
 Tongan language ISO 639 alpha-2 language code
 Tornado Outbreak, an action-adventure video game
 Tanki Online, a browser MMO game

In English 

 The grammatical particle to used to form for example the infinitive
 To, a preposition

See also
 
 T/O (disambiguation)
 Telephone operator (disambiguation)
 T and O map (orbis terrae), a type of medieval world map